Arthur Michael Robert Weaver (born May 2, 1978) is a Canadian former professional ice hockey defenceman.

Playing career

As a youth, Weaver played in the 1992 Quebec International Pee-Wee Hockey Tournament with the Chinguacousy Blues minor ice hockey team from Bramalea, Ontario. He later joined the Richmond Hill-Vaughan Kings of OMHA. After being a 7th round draft choice of the OHL's Guelph Storm in 1995, Weaver decided to remain playing OHA Junior A hockey to maintain his NCAA scholarship eligibility.

Weaver played Tier II Jr.A. with both the Thornhill Islanders and the Bramalea Blues. His final season with the Blues he led the club to a Dudley Hewitt Cup as OHA Junior A Champions and a berth in the 1999 Royal Bank Cup in Yorkton, Saskatchewan; Weaver's team was eliminated in the semi-finals.

The diminutive defenceman acquired a scholarship with the Michigan State Spartans and spent four very productive years in the CCHA that included two First All-Star team nods and two Best Defensive Defenceman awards.

Undrafted by the NHL, Weaver was signed as a free agent by the Atlanta Thrashers on June 15, 2000.  He spent the subsequent season with Atlanta's IHL affiliate, Orlando, with whom he won the Turner Cup as IHL champions.  In 2001–02, Weaver played his first 16 games in the NHL, in addition to helping the Thrashers' AHL affiliate, the Chicago Wolves, to a Calder Cup championship.  Most of his four seasons as a Thrasher would be spent in the AHL.

In the summer of 2004, Weaver would sign with the Los Angeles Kings as a free agent.  After playing 2004–05 with the Kings' AHL affiliate, Manchester, Weaver would play 2005–06 and 2006–07 in the NHL.

On August 8, 2007, Weaver was signed again as a free agent by the Pittsburgh Penguins. However, just before the start of the 2007–08 season, he was placed on waivers and picked up by Vancouver, where he played in 55 games. In the proceeding off season, he was signed by the St. Louis Blues. On August 3, 2010, Weaver left the Blues as a free agent and signed a two-year $1.8 million contract with the Florida Panthers.

In the 2013–14 season, his fourth with the Panthers, Weaver was traded to Montreal Canadiens for 5th round draft pick in 2015 NHL Entry Draft on March 4, 2014.

On May 15, 2015, it was announced by Canadiens GM Marc Bergevin, that Weaver will not return to the Montreal Canadiens next season. Having gone un-signed over the summer, on October 5, 2015, Weaver announced his retirement from professional hockey.

Career statistics

Awards and honours

References

External links

1978 births
Living people
Atlanta Thrashers players
Canadian ice hockey defencemen
Chicago Wolves players
Florida Panthers players
Ice hockey people from Ontario
Los Angeles Kings players
Manchester Monarchs (AHL) players
Montreal Canadiens players
Michigan State Spartans men's ice hockey players
Orlando Solar Bears (IHL) players
St. Louis Blues players
Sportspeople from Brampton
Undrafted National Hockey League players
Vancouver Canucks players
AHCA Division I men's ice hockey All-Americans